Pierre Joubert (born 2 May 1978 in Pretoria) was a South African cricketer for Northerns and the Titans, captaining the Titans between 2008 and 2010.

A right arm medium-fast bowler, Joubert represented South Africa Schools in 1994/95. He made his first class debut in 1995/96 for Northerns as well as captaining the Titans successfully. A handy lower-order right-handed batsman, he has passed 50 on 10 occasions and converted one of them into a century. Joubert has since retired from professional cricket as of 2012.

References

1978 births
Living people
Northerns cricketers
South African cricketers
Titans cricketers
Suffolk cricketers